A coupling reaction in organic chemistry refers to a variety of reactions where two fragments are joined together.  Often such reactions require the aid of a metal catalyst. In one important reaction type, a main group organometallic compound of the type R-M (R = organic fragment, M = main group center) reacts with an organic halide of the type R'-X with formation of a new carbon-carbon bond in the product R-R'. The most common type of coupling reaction is the cross coupling reaction.

Richard F. Heck, Ei-ichi Negishi, and Akira Suzuki were awarded the 2010 Nobel Prize in Chemistry for developing palladium-catalyzed cross coupling reactions.

Broadly speaking, two types of coupling reactions are recognized:
Homocouplings joining two identical partners.  The product is symmetrical 
Heterocouplings joining two different partners.  These reactions are also called cross-coupling reactions. The product is unsymmetrical, .

Homo-coupling types 
Coupling reactions are illustrated by the Ullmann reaction:

Cross-coupling types

Applications
Coupling reactions are routinely employed in the preparation of pharmaceuticals.  Conjugated polymers are prepared using this technology as well.

References

 
Organometallic chemistry
Carbon-carbon bond forming reactions
Catalysis